The S8 service of the S-Bahn Rhein-Main system bearing the KBS (German scheduled railway route) number 645.8. It is largely concurrent with the S9 service, diverging only to run local through Mainz (which the S9 bypasses). It runs 24 hours, 7 days.

Routes

Main Railway

City tunnel 

The city tunnel is an underground, pure S-Bahn route used by almost all services (except for the S7 service which terminates at the central station). In a short section between Mühlberg and Offenbach-Kaiserlei a line parallel with the South Main railway is used.

South Main S-Bahn

History 

In 1972 the Frankfurt Airport loop, a new line to connect the recently built Terminal Mitte (Central Terminal) at the Frankfurt Airport to the Central Station and the Main railway, became operational. Two years later the R14 experimental service running between Wiesbaden Central Station and Frankfurt Central Station started. After the opening of the Frankfurt Citytunnel the service was renamed to S14 and extended to the new Hauptwache underground station. In 1980 the new shuttle service S15 running between the Airport station and Frankfurt Central Station started operation. Further extensions of the tunnel followed in 1983 (Konstablerwache) and 1990 (Ostendstraße and Lokalbahnhof) so that the Südbahnhof (South station) became the S14's eastern terminal. In 1995 both services S14 and S15 were renamed to S8 and extended their operation to the east connecting the Central Station of Hanau. Like the S1 the S8 now also used the eastern branch of the Frankfurt Citytunnel as well as the Offenbach Citytunnel.

In 1990 two S14 trainsets collided near the Rüsselsheim station killing 17 and injuring 145 passengers. The conductor of the train bound for Frankfurt ignored the stop signal and crashed into an oncoming, fully occupied train.

Operation 

 Wiesbaden Hbf – Hanau Hbf
 Wiesbaden Hbf – Offenbach Ost
 Kelsterbach – Frankfurt Hbf
 Flughafen Regionalbahnhof – Frankfurt Hbf (former S15 service)
 Rüsselsheim – Offenbach Ost
 Rüsselsheim – Frankfurt Hbf

References

External links 

 traffiQ Frankfurt – S8/S9 timetable

Rhine-Main S-Bahn